Robert Leroy Wells Jr. (August 4, 1945 – August 7, 1994) was an American football offensive tackle. 

Wells was born in New York City in 1945 and attended Lucy Craft Laney High School in Augusta, Georgia. He played college football at Johnson C. Smith University in Charlotte, North Carolina, and was selected by the San Diego Chargers in the 15th round of the 1968 NFL Draft. He appeared in 20 games for the Chargers, two of them as a starter, from 1968 to 1970.  He also played for the Houston Texans of the World Football League in 1974.

References

1945 births
1994 deaths
American football tackles
Johnson C. Smith Golden Bulls football players
San Diego Chargers players
Players of American football from New York City